War is a city in McDowell County, West Virginia, United States. The population was 690 at the 2020 census. War was incorporated in 1920 by the Circuit Court of McDowell County. Its name is derived from War Creek, whose confluence with Dry Fork is located within the city. War is the only place in the United States with this name. War was formerly known as Miner's City. It is also known for being a setting in the movie October Sky; as writer Homer Hickam's Big Creek High School.

Geography

War had a railway station on the Norfolk Southern Railway (former Norfolk and Western)

Demographics

2010 census
As of the census of 2010, there were 862 people, 373 households, and 243 families living in the city. The racial makeup of the city was 94.7% White, 3.2% African American, 0.6% Native American, and 1.5% from two or more races. Hispanic or Latino of any race were 0.6% of the population.

There were 373 households, of which 27.6% had children under the age of 18 living with them, 46.1% were married couples living together, 13.4% had a female householder with no husband present, 5.6% had a male householder with no wife present, and 34.9% were non-families. 28.7% of all households were made up of individuals, and 13.5% had someone living alone who was 65 years of age or older. The average household size was 2.31 and the average family size was 2.78.

The median age in the city was 44.7 years. 19.5% of residents were under the age of 18; 6.8% were between the ages of 18 and 24; 23.9% were from 25 to 44; 30.2% were from 45 to 64; and 19.7% were 65 years of age or older. The gender makeup of the city was 49.2% male and 50.8% female.

2000 census
As of the census of 2000, there were 788 people, 331 households, and 225 families living in the city. The population density was 870.6 people per square mile (334.3/km2). There were 388 housing units at an average density of 428.7 per square mile (164.6/km2). The racial makeup of the city was 94.67% White, 4.57% African American, 0.25% Native American, 0.38% from other races, and 0.13% from two or more races. Hispanic or Latino of any race were 0.63% of the population.

There were 331 households, out of which 28.7% had children under the age of 18 living with them, 50.5% were married couples living together, 14.8% had a female householder with no husband present, and 32.0% were non-families. 29.3% of all households were made up of individuals, and 13.0% had someone living alone who was 65 years of age or older. The average household size was 2.38 and the average family size was 2.93.

In the city, the population was spread out, with 24.5% under the age of 18, 5.5% from 18 to 24, 26.1% from 25 to 44, 27.7% from 45 to 64, and 16.2% who were 65 years of age or older. The median age was 41 years. For every 100 females, there were 86.7 males. For every 100 females age 18 and over, there were 83.1 males.

The median income for a household in the city was $16,012, and the median income for a family was $20,521. Males had a median income of $32,500 versus $18,438 for females. The per capita income for the city was $9,285. About 34.8% of families and 43.3% of the population were below the poverty line, including 66.5% of those under age 18 and 15.1% of those age 65 or over.

Economy
Companies based in War include War Telephone.

See also
Warriormine, West Virginia

References

External links

 City of War's Official Site 

Cities in West Virginia
Cities in McDowell County, West Virginia
Pocahontas Coalfield
Coal towns in West Virginia